The MacRobertson International Croquet Shield is the premier croquet team event in the world.  It is currently competed for by Australia, England, New Zealand and the United States. It is known affectionately as the MacRob or just the Mac.

The series is now played in rotation between the competing countries every three or four years.

The most recent series was held in 2022 in Australia; it was won by England.

History
The competition is named after Australian confectionery maker and philanthropist, Sir Macpherson Robertson. In the early 1920s, Robertson played croquet as his pastime. He enlisted returned World War I veterans to take up concessions for his products and encouraged them to try croquet also, believing it to be a teaching aid for developing skills in self-discipline and risk management. Eventually, a pool of players were participating in regular tournaments. In 1925, with a growing interest in the sport, he established the MacRobertson Shield, an international tournament of croquet "Tests" between Australia and England. The Victorian Croquet Association sent a team of four players to England to contest the inaugural tournament. England won easily and Robertson presented the Shield personally.

In 1927-8 an England team played in Australia and was narrowly defeated. In 1930, New Zealand was invited to participate in a series between themselves and Australia, with Australia winning comfortably; the first triangular series was then held in 1935 in Melbourne as part of the Melbourne centenary celebrations. In 1993, a United States team was admitted into the tournament.

Between 1974 and 2010 the team representing the Croquet Association was named "Great Britain" and in two series "Great Britain and Ireland", because the teams included players from Scotland, Wales and Ireland. Following the introduction of the World Croquet Federation World Association Croquet Team Championship in 2010, the team was named "England" from the 2013-14 series and now only includes English qualified players.

Each team is represented by six players and since 1996 each test has been the best of 21 matches comprising 12 singles and 9 doubles.

The 2022 Series 
The 2022 Series  was played at Cairnlea, Melbourne, Australia in November 2022 and was won by England  over Australia, New Zealand and the United States.

The 2017 Series 

The 2017 Series  was played at Mission Hills Country Club in Rancho Mirage, California, USA and won by Australia over England, New Zealand and the United States. The tournament was held over three five-day tests and 21 matches.

The 2013-14 Series

The 2013-14 series  was contested in New Zealand across four different venues, and was won by New Zealand.

30 December 2013 - 3 January 2014: New Zealand v USA and England v Australia at United Croquet Club, Christchurch
England     16 - 5  Australia
New Zealand 20 - 1  USA
5 - 9 January: England v USA at Te Mata Croquet Club, Havelock North and New Zealand v Australia at Marewa Croquet Club, Napier
England     18 - 3  USA
New Zealand 15 - 4  Australia
11 - 15 January: New Zealand v England and Australia v USA at Mt Maunganui Croquet Club, Tauranga
New Zealand 13 - 7  England
Australia   17 - 4  USA

The 2010 Series

The 2010 Shield was contested in Great Britain, across five different venues, and was won by Great Britain.

6 – 10 August: Great Britain v USA at Bowdon, Greater Manchester and Australia v New Zealand at Heaton Park, Manchester
Great Britain 12 - 9  USA
Australia  8 - 13 New Zealand

12 – 16 August: Great Britain v New Zealand at Nottingham and Australia v USA at Roehampton
Great Britain 11 - 10 New Zealand
Australia  7 - 14 USA

18 – 22 August: Great Britain v Australia and New Zealand v USA both at Surbiton
Great Britain 14 - 7  Australia
USA 5 - 16 New Zealand

The 2006 Series

The 2006 series  was contested at Rich River, Moama, New South Wales and Shepparton, Victoria, Australia, and was won by Great Britain.

The 2003 Series

The 2003 series  was contested at The National Croquet Center, West Palm Beach, Florida, USA, and was won by Great Britain.

The 2000 Series

The 2000 series  was contested at The United Croquet Club, Christchurch, New Zealand, and was won by Great Britain.

Past results

See also 
 World Croquet Federation

References

External links
 2010 MacRobertson Shield
 MacRobertson Shield Records and Statistics

Croquet
Croquet in Australia
Recurring sporting events established in 1925
International sports competitions hosted by Australia